The 2021 MLR Collegiate Draft was the second annual for rugby union in North America. On August 19, 2021, the MLR hosted their second collegiate MLR Draft.

Format
The MLR Collegiate Draft 2021 took place on Thursday, August 19, 2021. For viewers in the United States, the first hour of the Draft was broadcast on FS2 at 6:30 p.m. EDT. Following the first hour, coverage switched to The Rugby Network. For viewers outside of the U.S., the entire Draft was streamed on The Rugby Network beginning at 6:30 p.m. EDT.

Like the inaugural draft, MLR used a "Draft-and-Follow" approach, meaning rights to drafted players was assigned following the MLR Collegiate Draft. MLR teams may activate those rights at any point until the mid-point of the next competitive MLR season AFTER the player is eligible to play in the MLR (through graduation/expiry of college eligibility/relinquishment of college eligibility). Drafting teams may sign those players or trade player rights with other MLR teams.

A player that isn't signed by a team within the above-mentioned rights period, may enter the subsequent year's draft as long as they are eligible. If they lose their Collegiate Draft eligibility, they may enter the MLR if a team desires their services.

Order of Selections
The order of selection was based on the reverse order of the regular season record during the 2021 MLR season. The Draft order is subject to change as teams make trades. Unlike the inaugural draft, this year's draft consisted of three rounds.

The draft order was determined by the reverse order of the league standings but is subject to change as teams make trades. The draft began with the expansion Dallas Jackals making the first pick, followed by the Houston SaberCats, Seattle Seawolves, Toronto Arrows, San Diego Legion, Rugby United New York (via Old Glory DC), Austin Gilgronis, New England Free Jacks, New Orleans Gold, Rugby United New York, Utah Warriors, Rugby ATL, and the 2021 MLR champion Los Angeles Giltinis.

Hosts
MLR All-Access' Stacy Paetz hosted this year's draft along with returning MLR analyst Dan Power and the first round pick of the Inaugural draft Conner Mooneyham were behind the desk. Also MLR sideline reporter Dani Wexelman returned to interview draftees.

Player selections

References

Major League Rugby Draft